The San Juan River (Spanish: Río San Juan), also known as El Desaguadero ("the drain"), is a  river that flows east out of Lake Nicaragua into the Caribbean Sea. A large section of the border between Nicaragua and Costa Rica runs on the southern bank of the river. It was part, with the lake, of a proposed route for a Nicaragua Canal in the 19th century. The idea of the project has been revived in the last decade, including the possibility of other routes within the country. The Ecocanal project has obtained a Concession from the National Assembly of Nicaragua to re-open the San Juan River to commercial barge traffic.

The Cañas–Jerez Treaty states that Nicaragua owns the waters of the river and that Costa Rica can only use it for commercial navigation on certain parts of the river at Nicaragua's discretion.

The San Juan River is home to freshwater bull sharks that also go into Lake Nicaragua in addition to a wide array of marine life and biodiversity.

History
Before the Panama Canal, the San Juan River was frequently used as a major part of the route from the Atlantic to the Pacific Ocean. Many people, including African slaves, were transported via this route. During the California Gold Rush, many people from all over the world traveled to California to mine for gold. Tens of thousands took a steamboat that was operated by the Accessory Transit Company and was directed by Cornelius Vanderbilt. The boat travelled up the San Juan River and across Lake Nicaragua; a stagecoach completed the connection to the Pacific coast.

Rapids
As one travels upstream from the Caribbean Sea to Lake Nicaragua, one encounters the following sets of rapids:
Raudal de Machuca
Raudal del Mico
Raudal Los Valos
Raudal del Castillo (Raudal del Diablo)
Raudal del Toro

See also
Boundary dispute along the San Juan River
El Castillo
Boca de Sabalos
Piracy on Lake Nicaragua

References

External links
 

Rivers of Nicaragua
Rivers of Costa Rica
Biosphere reserves of Nicaragua
International rivers of North America
Costa Rica–Nicaragua border
Lake Nicaragua
Border rivers